Andrew Sevier may refer to:

 Andrew L. Sevier (1894–1962), member of the Louisiana State Senate